The Aeromedical Center (AMC), is the Swiss center of excellence for medical and psychological assessments of men and women in the areas of military and civil aviation.

History
In 1922, the AMC was mentioned for the first time as an institute established to evaluate the aptitude and health of professional air force pilot candidates. From the outset, strict selection procedures and intensive support for the pilots have been the aim, so as to ensure missions are accomplished in the challenging environment of military aviation and to positively influence flight safety. On 23 October 2013, the FAI aviation medical doctor Volker Lang († 54), died when the F/A-18D J-5237, in which he flew as a passenger / observer, flew into the Mountain Lopper near Alpnach. The F/A-18 pilot Stefan Jäger of the Fliegerstaffel 11 also died.

Tasks
The AMC comprises flight medicine and flight psychology sections and the AMC director's staff. A team of some 35 specialists is made up of aviation physicians, psychologists and medical experts, sports scientists, physiotherapists and technical support and secretariat staff. The AMC is a key mission-oriented element in the air force, and in civilian aviation it is also fully recognised as an aeromedical center in accordance with the guidelines of the EASA and the FAA and is civilly accredited.

Equipment
The main military missions are the carrying out of suitability and suitability assessments of the military aviation personnel and other military specialists of the Air Force and the military area of the Skyguide. This includes regular health checks, the preparation of nutrition plans and the provision of vaccinations; As well as research and training in the fields of flight psychology and flight medicine. As a civilian aeromedical center on behalf of the Federal Office of Civil Aviation, the FAI carries out fitness tests for civilian professional pilots (Class 1) according to internationally valid standards (EASA, FAA). The FAI cooperates with military and civilian partners both nationally and internationally. FAI users include military pilots, parachute reconnaissance aircraft, on-board crew, on-board crew, Loadmaster etc., airspace surveillance personnel for the civilian and military skyguide, candidates for general staff training, special forces, civilian pilots, line pilots and members of the Swiss Federal Council.
The FAI has a test room for the SPHAIR program, equipment in the fields of medical equipment, laboratory, x-ray, power test, hearing and vision tests, Health club training and instruction. The FAI has the only negative pressure chamber in Switzerland. This is used for the training of the flying personnel in hypobar hypoxia as well as for the research. There, equipment and materials are tested for use in aviation.

Research
The FAI conducts research in the areas of human performance in aviation, test development and hypoxia. The FAI participates in national and international specialist events and makes its findings available to the public.

Vocational training
The FAI offers apprenticeships and internships: commercial employees, medical practitioners and psychological trainees. In the case of medical training, the FAI is recognized as a training center for occupational medicine, general Internal medicine and the basic course for Aeromedical Examiner according to the requirements of EASA. The FAI is part of the Flight Safety Board, the Command and Command of the Luftwaffe, and the crisis and care organization of the Swiss Army. The FAI participates in the humanitarian operations of the army in favor of the FDFA.

External links

 Aeromedical Center (AMC)
 F/A-18D crash at the Lopper (German language)
 Plan
 SkyTalk: Interview mit Philip Noser, Chef Flugpsychologie im FAI (German)
 Sarah Schmidlin: Der Mann, der auf den Mars will. In: SRF. Reportage from the Aeromedical Center (AMC) in German

Aviation medicine organizations
Medical research institutes in Switzerland
Air force units and formations of Switzerland